Fraas is a surname. Notable people with the surname include:

Eberhard Fraas (1862–1915), German geologist and paleontologist, son of Oscar
Karl Nikolas Fraas (1810–1875), German botanist
Oscar Fraas (1824–1897), German paleontologist

See also
 Fras (disambiguation)